The 2014 Deutsche Tourenwagen Masters was the twenty-eighth season of premier German touring car championship and also fifteenth season under the moniker of Deutsche Tourenwagen Masters since the series' resumption in 2000. The season started on 4 May at Hockenheim, and ended on 19 October at the same venue, after a total of ten rounds.

In his second season in the series, BMW Team RMG driver Marco Wittmann became champion after his consistent finishes throughout the season left him with a comfortable 50-point winning margin. Wittmann took his first series victory in the opening race at Hockenheim, and quickly added a second victory at the Hungaroring. He also won back-to-back races at the Red Bull Ring and the Nürburgring, before clinching the title at Lausitzring. Mattias Ekström finished the season as runner-up for Audi Sport Team Abt Sportsline, winning the season's final two races at Zandvoort and Hockenheim – Audi's only victories of the 2014 season. Another Audi driver clinched third in the championship, as defending champion Mike Rockenfeller finished in the position for Audi Sport Team Phoenix; he took three second places during the year, but went winless. Other drivers to take victories were Wittmann's team-mate Maxime Martin at Moscow Raceway, with HWA triumvirate Robert Wickens (Norisring), Christian Vietoris (Oschersleben) and Pascal Wehrlein (Lausitzring) taking victories for Mercedes; for Vietoris and Wehrlein, it was their first in the series.

It was also the last season of the single-legged race format before it was replaced by the two-legged DTM race format for the following season (with both races held on Saturday and Sunday).

Calendar
A provisional ten-round calendar was announced on 16 October 2013.

In July, it was announced that the Chinese round – originally scheduled for 28 September on a temporary street circuit in Guangzhou – was cancelled, as the modifications necessary for erecting the circuit proved to be far more extensive than first planned. As a result, a replacement round was scheduled for the same weekend, held at Zandvoort in the Netherlands.

Teams and drivers
The following manufacturers, teams and drivers competed in the 2014 Deutsche Tourenwagen Masters. All teams competed with tyres supplied by Hankook.

Driver changes
 Entering DTM
 BMW test driver and Marc VDS Racing Team driver Maxime Martin was promoted to a race seat in BMW Team RMG for the 2014 season.
 Both António Félix da Costa and Nico Müller, who finished third and fifth in the 2013 Formula Renault 3.5 Series season, joined the DTM series, driving for BMW Team MTEK and Team Rosberg respectively.
 Former Renault and Caterham Formula One driver Vitaly Petrov entered the championship, driving a Mercedes-Benz.

 Leaving DTM
 Filipe Albuquerque, who drove for Audi switched to the marque's LMP and GT programme.
 Andy Priaulx, who drove for BMW in 2012 and 2013, left the series and joined the United SportsCar Championship.
 Dirk Werner, who drove for BMW in 2012 and 2013, left the series and joined the BMW endurance programme, including competing at the 24 Hours Nürburgring.
 Roberto Merhi who drove for Mercedes in 2012 and 2013, left the series and joined Zeta Corse in the Formula Renault 3.5 Series. He remained a Mercedes test and reserve driver.

Results and standings

Results summary

Championship standings
Scoring system
Points were awarded to the top ten classified finishers as follows:

Drivers' championship

† — Driver retired, but was classified as they completed 75% of the winner's race distance.

Teams' championship

Manufacturers' championship

References

External links
  

Deutsche Tourenwagen Masters seasons
Deutsche Tourenwagen Masters